The 2020–21 season was Stoke City's 104th season in the Football League, the 44th in the second tier and seventh in the Championship.

Due to the ongoing COVID-19 pandemic the 2020–21 season began later in September with matches continuing to played behind closed doors. Stoke began the season in good form, winning eight of their first 16 matches and were just outside the play-off places at the beginning of December. However a number of injuries to key players most notably to Tyrese Campbell saw goals dry up and the team went nine games without a win at the turn of the year. Stoke were unable to put a sustained run of results together in March and April and ended the season in mid-table.

Pre-season
Stoke announced their retained list in July 2020, leaving the club were goalkeeper Adam Federici from the first team, and Jake Dunwoody, James Jennings, Ash Kigbu, Cameron McJannet, Tre Pemberton, Abdul Sankoh, Ollie Shenton and Scott Wara from the under-23 squad. Also leaving were the two players who agreed to temporary contract extensions to cover the final nine games of the 2019–20 season, Mame Biram Diouf and Stephen Ward. O'Neill made his first signing of the summer bringing in former Sheffield Wednesday left-back Morgan Fox. Centre-back James Chester re-joined the club having spent the second half of last season on loan from Aston Villa. Stoke brought in former Sheffield Wednesday striker Steven Fletcher on 14 August. Former Chelsea midfielder John Obi Mikel joined the club on 17 August 2020 having left Trabzonspor in March. On 9 September Stoke brought in winger Jacob Brown from Barnsley.

The squad returned to Clayton Wood on 7 August and the following week travelled to Belfast for a training camp and a behind closed doors friendly against NIFL Premiership champions Linfield at Windsor Park. Stoke won 1–0 with a first half strike from Josh Tymon. They then played two matches against League One sides, losing 1–0 to Burton Albion and beating Shrewsbury Town 5–1. Stoke ended their pre-season schedule with back-to-back wins over Premier League sides Leeds United and Newcastle United.

Championship

Because the 2019–20 season was extended into the summer of 2020 due to the COVID-19 pandemic, the 2020–21 season started at a later date of 12 September 2020 with matches continuing to be played behind-closed doors. The summer transfer window was open from 27 July to 16 October.

September
For the season opener away at Millwall, Michael O'Neill started new signings Morgan Fox and John Obi Mikel. The match was a cagey affair with few chances and it unsurprisingly ended in a goalless draw. Stoke produced a poor performance in the first home game of the campaign against Bristol City, with the Robins winning 2–0 with goals from Nahki Wells and Andreas Weimann. Stoke earned their first victory of the campaign away at Preston North End on 26 September. Preston started the match the better team but the match turned in Stoke's favor after Tom Barkhuizen was sent-off in the 22nd minute for a tackle on Morgan Fox. Stoke went on to win 1–0 with a close range finish from Lee Gregory.

October
Stoke faced Birmingham City in the first match in October and despite having the better possession and chances they were frustrated by a well disciplined Birmingham side and they took the lead through a Harlee Dean header. O'Neill brought on Powell from the bench and he scored in the 86th minute to help Stoke earn a 1–1 draw. Following the international break, Stoke travelled to Luton Town where former manager Nathan Jones had returned to. After an uneventful first half Stoke scored twice early in the second through Fletcher and Powell to see out a 2–0 victory. Four days later they took on Barnsley and poor defending cost them in the first half as Elliot Simões gave the Tykes the lead before Campbell equalised just before half time only for Dominik Frieser to score in stoppage time. A mistake from Jack Walton just after half time allowed Tommy Smith to score his first goal for the club. Nathan Collins was sent-off for an off the ball incident with Frieser and Stoke were able to see out a 2–2 draw. Collins' red card was later rescinded by the FA. Stoke put in a fine performance against promotion favorites Brentford and were 3–0 up after goals from Campbell, Fletcher and McClean before a late brace from Marcus Forss ensured a nervy finish but Stoke were able to gain a 3–2 win. City then produced an abject performance away at Swansea City where they lost 2–0 without having a shot on target. Stoke ended October with a 1–0 win against Rotherham United with a long kick from Angus Gunn being lobbed into the Millers net by McClean.

November
Stoke were then controversially beaten 3–2 by Watford at Vicarage Road. Fletcher had given Stoke an early lead before Tom Cleverley leveled for Watford despite clearly barging into Angus Gunn. A João Pedro penalty put Watford in front with Stoke responding through Powell. Ismaïla Sarr won the match late on for the Hornets despite a handball in the build up. Stoke beat early league leaders Reading 3–0 with goals from Campbell, Fletcher and Brown to earn a first league victory at the Madjeski Stadium. Stoke suffered an injury problem after both senior goalkeepers, Adam Davies and Angus Gunn were ruled out for up to two months with Josef Bursik being recalled from his loan at Doncaster Rovers. Bursik started two days later against Carlos Corberán's Huddersfield Town who took the lead through Carel Eiting. Two quick goals from Campbell put Stoke in front before Isaac Mbenza levelled for the Terriers. An own goal from Richard Stearman ensured Stoke went into half time with a 3–2 lead which was extended by Sam Clucas early in the second half. Naby Sarr pulled another goal back for Huddersfield but Stoke held out for a 4–3 victory. Stoke struggled against leaders Norwich City and were 3–0 down early in the second half after goals from Emiliano Buendía and a brace from Teemu Pukki. Buendía was then sent-off which sparked a comeback from Stoke with Campbell and Collins scoring but Norwich held on to win 3–2. November ended with a drab goalless draw at Tony Pulis' Sheffield Wednesday.

December
Stoke's goalkeeping injury crisis worsened prior to the match against Wycombe Wanderers after Niki Mäenpää who was signed on a temporary deal to provide cover for Bursik, also suffered an injury in training meaning that Andy Lonergan was brought in on a similar contract. 1,000 Wycombe fans were allowed to attend the match following the end of the second lockdown in England and they saw Nick Powell score the only goal of the game after 72 minutes. Stoke moved into a play-off position for the first time this season with a 1–0 win over Middlesbrough thanks to a first half header from Nathan Collins. They then missed the chance to move into an automatic place as Cardiff City came from behind to win 2–1. A depleted Stoke team played out a goalless draw at Derby County on 12 December. Stoke suffered another long-term injury after it was confirmed that Campbell would miss the rest of the season. Three days later they played out another goalless draw this time away at Queens Park Rangers. They then ground out a 1–0 win over Blackburn Rovers with Powell scoring an early diving header. On Boxing day against Coventry City, City played out a third consecutive goalless away draw. Stoke ended 2020 with a 1–1 draw against Nottingham Forest in foggy conditions.

January
Stoke began 2021 with a narrow defeat against promotion chasing AFC Bournemouth. For the trip to Blackburn Rovers, O'Neil gave first starts to new signings Rabbi Matondo and Rhys Norrington-Davies in what was Stoke's youngest starting eleven for 15 years with an average age of 25. Powell gave Stoke a first half lead before Blackburn equalised through John Buckley. James Chester was then sent-off after bringing down Adam Armstrong who was through on goal and Stoke held on for a 1–1 draw. The side then drew 3–3 at relegation threatened Rotherham United with O'Neill critical of his teams defending. Stoke ended January without a win after defeat against Watford and a draw away at Huddersfield Town where Rhys Norrington-Davies was sent-off just before half time.

In the January transfer window, O'Neill trimmed his squad by loaning out Moritz Bauer, Lee Gregory, Tom Ince, Liam Lindsay and Kevin Wimmer whilst Thibaud Verlinden left on a permanent basis. Coming in were Alfie Doughty from Charlton Athletic and three loans Jack Clarke, Rabbi Matondo and Rhys Norrington-Davies.

February
Stoke's barren run of form continued into February with a goalless draw against Reading and a heavy defeat at Norwich. Stoke ended their nine-game winless run with a 1–0 win against Sheffield Wednesday with Steven Fletcher scoring against his former club. On 19 February 2021, club captain Ryan Shawcross left Stoke by mutual consent after 14 years ahead of a move to Inter Miami CF in the United States. City coasted to a 3–0 win against Luton Town with Powell scoring twice to complete a league double over the Hatters. The team then put in an inept performance away at Barnsley, losing 2–0. Stoke ended February with a first visit to the Brentford Community Stadium where they lost 2–1 despite taking the lead in the first minute.

March
Stoke lost a third game in a row after a 2–1 defeat against Swansea. Powell gave City an early lead but goals from Connor Roberts and a controversial late penalty from André Ayew earned Swansea the win. Three days later they ended their losing run with a 2–0 home win over rock bottom Wycombe Wanderers, with Rhys Norrington-Davies and Harry Souttar scoring their first goals for the club. They were then easily beaten 3–0 by Middlesbrough. Stoke played out a goalless draw with Cardiff City with under-23s striker Christian Norton making his league debut. A goal from Jacob Brown gave Stoke a 1–0 win against Derby County in the final match of March to move the team past the 50 point mark.

April
Over the Easter weekend Stoke had mixed fortunes as they beat Bristol City 2–0 at Ashton Gate on Good Friday but then lost 2–1 to Millwall on Easter Monday. The following week the team lost again, this time 2–0 to relegation threatened Birmingham City. Following the Birmingham game assistant manager Billy McKinlay left the club and was replaced by the former Bristol City manager Dean Holden. Stoke played out a drab goalless draw with Preston North End on 17 April with Harry Souttar being sent-off late on after bringing down Alan Browne. Stoke lost 3–2 to Coventry City, with O'Neil highly critical of his team's performance. Stoke drew 1–1 at Nottingham Forest with Rabbi Matondo first goal for the club being cancelled out by Lewis Grabban.

May
Stoke lost their penultimate game of the season 2–0 to Queens Park Rangers. Stoke ended the 2020–21 season with a 2–0 win against AFC Bournemouth with academy graduate Will Forrester scoring on his debut.

Results

League table

FA Cup

Stoke were drawn against Leicester City in the FA Cup and were well beaten 4–0 making it five consecutive third round exits.

EFL Cup

In the first round of the EFL Cup Stoke beat EFL League One side Blackpool 5–4 on penalties after a goalless ninety minutes. On September 17 2020, Stoke went on to beat Wolverhampton Wanderers in the second round, after a late winner from Jacob Brown. In the Third Round, Stoke edged past League One side Gillingham 1–0 with a goal from Tyrese Campbell in the 37th minute. City again won 1–0 in the fourth round away at Aston Villa with a first half header from Sam Vokes. Stoke faced a strong Tottenham Hotspur side in the quarter final. Spurs won 3–1 with goals from Gareth Bale, Ben Davies and Harry Kane whilst Jordan Thompson scored his first goal for Stoke.

Squad statistics

Transfers

In

Out

Loans in

Loans out

References

Stoke City F.C.
Stoke City F.C. seasons